Central Connecticut State University has awarded 55 honorary doctoral degrees since 1985. Awardees have included the CEOs or Chairmen of seven major corporations, eight heads of state, and a variety of others. About half of these degrees have been awarded at commencement exercises at the university, and in most such cases, the conferee has given the commencement address.

Although significant non-degree honors have historically been awarded by the institution, honorary doctorates were not conferred until after Central Connecticut State College was renamed Central Connecticut State University in 1983. U.S. President Jimmy Carter became the first recipient on April 16, 1985, receiving a Doctor of Humane Letters.

List of Recipients

Notes
† recipient is a CCSU graduate
‡ recipient represented a partner of CCSU's International Affairs Center and Connecticut Institute for Asian and American Studies,
a Honorary degree awarded in connection with recipient's delivery of the Robert C. Vance Distinguished Lecture.
∗ abbreviated degree names:
<small>D.C.J.: Doctor of Criminal JusticeD.C.Sc.: Doctor of Commercial ScienceD.H.P.Ed.: Doctor of Health and Physical EducationD.P.S.: Doctor of Public ServiceD.S.Sc: Doctor of Social ScienceEd.L.: Doctor of Educational LeadershipL.H.D.: Doctor of Humane LettersLL.D.: Doctor of LawsPed.D.: Doctor of PedagogySc.D.: Doctor of Science

References

Central Connecticut State University
Central Connecticut State
United States education-related lists